David Matam (born 5 June 1975) is a French-Cameroonian weightlifter. He competed in the men's light heavyweight event at the 2004 Summer Olympics.

References

1975 births
Living people
French male weightlifters
Olympic weightlifters of France
Weightlifters at the 2004 Summer Olympics
Sportspeople from Yaoundé
Commonwealth Games medallists in weightlifting
Commonwealth Games gold medallists for Cameroon
Commonwealth Games bronze medallists for Cameroon
Weightlifters at the 1998 Commonwealth Games
Weightlifters at the 2002 Commonwealth Games
Medallists at the 1998 Commonwealth Games
Medallists at the 2002 Commonwealth Games